Stan Dawson (12 August 1917 – 25 December 1973) was an Australian rules footballer who played with Collingwood and Fitzroy in the Victorian Football League (VFL). In 1941 he transferred from Collingwood to Victorian Football Association club, Preston. He usually played on the half forward line.

References

External links

1917 births
Australian rules footballers from Victoria (Australia)
Fitzroy Football Club players
Fitzroy Football Club Premiership players
Collingwood Football Club players
Preston Football Club (VFA) players
1973 deaths
One-time VFL/AFL Premiership players